Here's Your Christmas Album is a 1999 comedy album by comedian Bill Engvall. It contains original Christmas songs, some with vocals from Engvall and others by studio singers. It was re-released in 2005.

Track listing
"Introduction" (0:26)
"I'm Getting Sued by Santa Claus" (3:37)
"Christmas in the Country Holiday" (3:19)
"Rudolph Got a DUI" (2:57)
"The Christmas Sign" (4:01)
"A Gift that She Doesn't Want" (4:02)
"Gift Emergency" (3:28)
"Fruitcake Makes Me Puke" (3:49)
"That's What Wrong with Christmas" (4:52)
"Here's Your Sign Christmas" (2:32)
"The Bike" (3:02)
"Fruitcake Makes Me Puke" (Rock Version) (3:44)

Chart performance

References

1999 Christmas albums
Christmas albums by American artists
Bill Engvall albums
Warner Records albums
1990s comedy albums